Guilherme Mantuan (born 2 August 1997) is a Brazilian professional footballer who plays for Botafogo de Ribeirão Preto. 

He is the older brother of Gustavo Mantuan.

Club career
Born in São Paulo, Mantuan arrived at the academy of Corinthians in 2004 and initially played for the futsal team. In September 2016, he was promoted to the first team and signed a contract till the end of 2018. He captained the junior team which won the São Paulo Junior Football Cup in 2017.

On 30 June 2017, Mantuan signed a contract extension which would keep him at the club till the end of 2020. He made his first team debut on 3 December, coming as a substitute for Pedrinho in a 1–0 defeat against Sport Recife.

On 18 December 2018, Mantuan was loaned out to Ponte Preta for the upcoming season.

Career statistics

Honours
Corinthians
Campeonato Brasileiro Série A: 2017
Campeonato Paulista: 2018

References

External links

1997 births
Living people
Association football midfielders
Brazilian footballers
Footballers from São Paulo
Campeonato Brasileiro Série A players
Campeonato Brasileiro Série B players
Primeira Liga players
Sport Club Corinthians Paulista players
Associação Atlética Ponte Preta players
Oeste Futebol Clube players
Gil Vicente F.C. players
Botafogo Futebol Clube (SP) players
Brazilian expatriate footballers
Brazilian expatriate sportspeople in Portugal
Expatriate footballers in Portugal